Deception Creek is a stream in the U.S. state of Colorado.

Deception Creek was named for quicksand along its course which frequently killed livestock.

See also
List of rivers of Colorado

References

Rivers of Moffat County, Colorado
Rivers of Colorado